Charles William "Lefty" Willis (November 4, 1905 – May 10, 1962) was a Major League Baseball pitcher who played from  to  with the Philadelphia Athletics.

External links

1905 births
1962 deaths
Major League Baseball pitchers
Baseball players from West Virginia
Philadelphia Athletics players
Martinsburg Blue Sox players
Shepherd Rams baseball players
Nashville Vols players